Ross Cronjé (born 26 July 1989) is a South African Rugby player.

He is the twin brother of former Zimbabwean international Guy Cronjé.

External links

Lions profile
itsrugby.co.uk profile

Living people
1989 births
South African rugby union players
Rugby union scrum-halves
Rugby union players from Johannesburg
Sharks (Currie Cup) players
Sharks (rugby union) players
Golden Lions players
Lions (United Rugby Championship) players
Afrikaner people
South African twins
Twin sportspeople
South Africa Under-20 international rugby union players
South Africa international rugby union players
Alumni of Michaelhouse